Vancouver South was a provincial electoral district in the Canadian province of British Columbia.  It was created in time for the general election of 1966 and last appeared in the general election of 1986.  It returned two members of the Legislative Assembly of British Columbia.

Electoral history

Sources 

Elections BC Historical Returns

Former provincial electoral districts of British Columbia